The 1967 St. Louis Cardinals season was the team's 86th season in St. Louis, Missouri, its 76th season in the National League, and its first full season at Busch Memorial Stadium.  Gussie Busch hired former outfielder Stan Musial as general manager before the season.  Featuring four future Hall of Famers in Lou Brock, Bob Gibson, Steve Carlton and Orlando Cepeda, "El Birdos" went 101–60 during the season and won the NL pennant by 10½ games over the San Francisco Giants.  They went on to win the 1967 World Series in seven games over the Boston Red Sox.

Offseason
 December 8, 1966: Charley Smith was traded by the Cardinals to the New York Yankees for Roger Maris.
 December 14, 1966: Walt Williams and Don Dennis were traded by the Cardinals to the Chicago White Sox for Johnny Romano and Lee White (minors).

Regular season
First baseman Orlando Cepeda won the MVP Award this year, batting .325, with 25 home runs and 111 RBIs. He was the first unanimous selection (all 20 first-place votes for 280 points) for the award in the history of the National League. Catcher Tim McCarver was second in the MVP voting for 136 points. Pitcher Bob Gibson and outfielder Curt Flood won Gold Gloves this year.

Flood, whose record streak of 568 consecutive chances in the field without an error ended June 4 when he dropped a fly ball, returned to regular play in late July. His 227-game string had begun September 3, 1965. Once back in the lineup, he batted .373 the rest of the season, finishing fourth in the league at .335.

Season standings

Record vs. opponents

Notable transactions
 April 1, 1967: Art Mahaffey, Jerry Buchek and Tony Martínez were traded by the Cardinals to the New York Mets for Ed Bressoud, Danny Napoleon, and cash.
 June 6, 1967: Ted Simmons was drafted by the Cardinals in the 1st round (10th pick) of the 1967 Major League Baseball Draft.

Roster

Player stats

Batting

Starters by position
Note: Pos = Position; G = Games played; AB = At bats; H = Hits; Avg. = Batting average; HR = Home runs; RBI = Runs batted in

Other batters
Note: G = Games played; AB = At bats; H = Hits; Avg. = Batting average; HR = Home runs; RBI = Runs batted in

Pitching

Starting pitchers
Note: G = Games pitched; IP = Innings pitched; W = Wins; L = Losses; ERA = Earned run average; SO = Strikeouts

Other pitchers
Note: G = Games pitched; IP = Innings pitched; W = Wins; L = Losses; ERA = Earned run average; SO = Strikeouts

Relief pitchers
Note: G = Games pitched; W = Wins; L = Losses; SV = Saves; ERA = Earned run average; SO = Strikeouts

1967 World Series 

St. Louis defeated the Boston Red Sox in the World Series, bursting "The Impossible Dream" bubble of the latter team, which had won their first pennant in 21 years on the last day of the season.  Bob Gibson won Games 1, 4 and 7 in the Series and was named Series MVP for a second time.  Nelson Briles won Game 3.  Gibson came back from a broken leg during the season to accomplish his incredible World Series performance.  KMOX radio awarded Lou Brock a car for his superb play (12–29 .414 with a record-tying 7 stolen bases) in the Series.

Despite winning a World Series in his first season as general manager, Musial stepped down, citing that he did not think the occupation was right for him, making it his  only season as GM.  He worked in other capacities in the Cardinals front office until 1980.  Busch rehired Bing Devine after Musial's resignation.

Awards and honors
 Lou Brock, Babe Ruth Award
 Orlando Cepeda, National League Most Valuable Player Award
 Bob Gibson, World Series Most Valuable Player Award
 Red Schoendienst, Associated Press NL Manager of the Year

Farm system

LEAGUE CHAMPIONS: St. Petersburg

References

External links
1967 St. Louis Cardinals at Baseball Reference
1967 St. Louis Cardinals team page at www.baseball-almanac.com

St. Louis Cardinals seasons
Saint Louis Cardinals season
National League champion seasons
World Series champion seasons
St Louis